Entrepreneur is a 1997 business simulation video game by Stardock Systems. A sequel, Business Tycoon, was released in 2000.

Gameplay 
The game sees the player build a successful company and dominate the market through corporate warfare. Players need to research, manufacture, and market their products better than their competitors, and when in financial trouble they can seek help from criminal figures.

Critical reception 
Jacob Proffitt of Gamezilla praised the core idea behind the game, but said that it failed in its execution. GameSpot's Tim McDonald too appreciated the novel idea of having a strategy game where the weapon is business deal not tanks, but criticised the "fussy interface and nebulous economics".

References 

1997 video games
Business simulation games
OS/2 games
Stardock games
Video games developed in the United States
Windows games